The Movement for the Liberation of the Enclave of Cabinda  (MLEC) is a defunct, separatist organization that campaigned for the independence of Cabinda province from Portugal. MLEC merged with the Action Committee of the Cabinda National Union and the Mayombe National Alliance in 1963 to form the Front for the Liberation of the Enclave of Cabinda. Cabinda is now a province and an exclave of Angola.

References

Rebel groups in Angola
National liberation movements in Africa
Cabinda independence movement